Kumaresan Duraisamy (born 2 December 1963), known professionally by his stage name Napoleon, is an Indian actor, politician and entrepreneur. He was the Minister of State for Social Justice and Empowerment in Indian Prime Minister Manmohan Singh's cabinet. He has acted in Tamil, Telugu, Malayalam, Kannada and English movies.

Early life
He graduated from St. Joseph's College, Trichy.

Career

Politics
Napolean became enthused by the ideologies of the Dravida Munnetra Kazhagam (DMK) party. He joined the party in which his uncle K. N. Nehru was already a member and at that time the Public Welfare Minister of the state government.

Napoleon contested the State Assembly elections of 2001, winning the Villivakkam constituency contest and thereby becoming a Member of the Legislative Assembly of Tamil Nadu. He lost his membership in the 2006 elections, when he contested from the Mylapore constituency and was defeated by actor S. Ve. Shekhar. Subsequently, Napoleon nurtured the Perambalur constituency in the hope of becoming a member of parliament for the DMK and succeeded in the 2009 Lok Sabha election. He was then appointed Minister of State for Social Justice and Empowerment in Union government. Seen as a loyalist of Azhagiri, he was sidelined by DMK after the expulsion of the latter from the party in 2014. He joined the BJP in the presence of party President Amit Shah on 21 December 2014. He was made the party's state vice-president on 26 November 2015.

Films

When aged 27, he watched the film Udhayam, the dubbed version of the Telugu film Siva, and was inspired to take up acting. He entered the Tamil film industry in 1991 with Bharathiraja's rural film Pudhu Nellu Pudhu Naathu, playing the antagonist role. After the stupendous success of Ejamaan (1993), Napoleon went on to play the villain to great effect in Malayalam and Telugu cinema too. He is praised for good best performance and acting in his Malayalam movie called Devasuram (1993). Napoleon turned hero on-screen too with Kizhakku Cheemayile (1993) in which he played an anti-hero. After that film, Pratap Pothen gave Seevalaperi Pandi (1994). That film turned out to be a mega hit. He was awarded Tamil Nadu State Film Award Special Prize for his performance in Ettupatti Rasa (1997).

In 1998, he was awarded the Kalaimamani and MGR Award. From 2000 to 2006, he was appointed as the vice-president of the South Indian Film Artistes Association.

Later after years into film industry, he also got the chance to work in stone blockbuster movies such as Pokkiri (2007) and Dasavathaaram (2008).

Though he settled in Nashville, Tennessee, United States of America, at the insistence of the industry stalwarts, he made his acting comeback with Kidaari (2016). He then went on to portray Gautham Karthik's father in Muthuramalingam (2017) replacing Karthik.

After making his Hollywood debut in the supernatural thriller, Devil's Night: Dawn of the Nain Rouge (2019), he is seen in another American independent film titled Christmas Coupon (2019). Napoleon also proudly announced that he is the only Tamil actor, who had acted in a Hollywood film, which was completely shot in the US.

Entrepreneurship

Nepoleon Duraisamy forayed into IT Entrepreneurship and kick started "Jeevan Technologies"  IT operations in Chennai, India in the year 2000. Jeevan is a trusted technology transformation partner of enterprises across the globe under his able mentorship.

Social entrepreneurship
In 2010, Napoleon established Myopathy Unit of Jeevan Foundation, the Institute for Muscular Dystrophy & Research Center. It is a non-profit organization registered under the Tamil Nadu Trust Act.

Achievements and awards

 Tamil Nadu State Film Award Special Prize for Ettupatti Rasa (1997)
 Kalaimamani and MGR Award (1998)
 Vice-president of the South Indian Film Artistes' Association (2000–2006)
 Murasoli Trust "Kalaignar" Award, which is given to people who contribute to Tamil language, literature and culture (2007).

Filmography
As actor

As singer

References

External links

 Official biographical sketch in Parliament of India website
 Actor Napoleon's website
 Jeevan Technologies
 Jeevan Foundation

1963 births
Living people
21st-century Indian male actors
Tamil male actors
Indian actor-politicians
India MPs 2009–2014
Male actors in Malayalam cinema
Male actors from Tiruchirappalli
Union Ministers from Tamil Nadu
Dravida Munnetra Kazhagam politicians
St Joseph's College, Tiruchirappalli alumni
Recipients of the Kalaimamani Award
Lok Sabha members from Tamil Nadu
Tamil Nadu State Film Awards winners
Male actors in Tamil cinema
Indian male film actors
Male actors in Telugu cinema
20th-century Indian male actors
People from Perambalur district